WOMR (92.1 FM) is a public broadcasting community radio station based in Provincetown, Massachusetts. Its call-sign stands for "Outermost Radio". It started broadcasting in 1982 on 91.9MHz, switching to 92.1 in 1995 to gain a power boost from 1 kilowatt to 6 kilowatt, and allowing it to reach as far away as Plymouth. In 2010, WOMR began to broadcast up the Cape from its repeater in Orleans, which goes under the call-sign WFMR (Furthermost Radio) and transmits on 91.3MHz.

Programming
The station airs freeform programming 20 hours a day, all of which is produced by 120 volunteers and three full-time and one part-time staff members. The D.J.s play music of their choosing.  Among the kinds of music that can be heard on WOMR are folk, blues, classical, roots, country, oldies, punk, funk, rock, jazz, indie pop, soul, Celtic, bluegrass, dixieland, reggae and many forms of world music. In October 2009, WOMR replaced their analog transmitter with a digital/analog model. With an emergency back-up system, WOMR can stay on the air in power outages, bringing vital information to the Outer Cape Community.

Funding
WOMR/WFMR operates on an annual budget of $490,000. Its funding sources include listener support across the Cape and in many off-Cape places (52%), a grant from the Corporation for Public Broadcasting (16%), underwriting from local businesses (11%), fundraising events (10%), and rental income from art galleries in the Schoolhouse building in which the Provincetown studios are housed (11%). The station seeks listener support through on-air fundraisers and direct mailings asking for donations and additional member support.

Partnerships
WOMR/WFMR has partnered with local Cape Cod communities and community organizations, joining festivals and events across Cape Cod, occasionally with live remote broadcasts. WOMR/WFMR produces a triathlon in Wellfleet, during the second weekend in June.  The station often partners with the Payomet Performing Arts Center in Truro and with Wellfleet Preservation Hall to produce concerts and film events.

In 2011–2015, film director Alan Chebot produced Outermost Radio, a film portraying the diversity of the station's programmers, and highlighting the challenges the station faced in 2012 when their main antenna toppled and needed to be replaced.

See also
Outermost Radio, a documentary film about the station
List of community radio stations in the United States

External links
 WOMR Outermost Community Radio official website

OMR
Community radio stations in the United States
Provincetown, Massachusetts
Radio stations established in 1982
1982 establishments in Massachusetts